Guseletovo is a rural locality (a selo) and the administrative center of Guseletovsky Selsoviet, Romanovsky District, Altai Krai, Russia. The population was 911 as of 2013. There are 6 streets.

Geography 
Guseletovo is located 14 km southeast of Romanovo (the district's administrative centre) by road. Chyornaya Kurya is the nearest rural locality.

References 

Rural localities in Romanovsky District, Altai Krai